The 1989–90 Serie A season was the 56th season of the Serie A, the top level of ice hockey in Italy. 10 teams participated in the league, and HC Bozen won the championship by defeating Asiago Hockey in the final.

Regular season

Playoffs

Relegation round

External links
 Season on hockeyarchives.info

1989-90
Italy
Italy